The 1848 New South Wales colonial election was held between 29 July and 2 August. No candidates were nominated for Port Phillip as a result of the campaign for independence from New South Wales, and a fresh writ was issued for an election on 3 October.

Results by district

County of Argyle

County of Bathurst

The returning officer gave his casting vote in favour of John Darvall.

County of Camden

Counties of Cook and Westmoreland

The election of James Martin was declared void on the grounds that he was not qualified to stand; however, he was re-elected unopposed. Martin subsequently sued the Speaker of the Legislative Council, Charles Nicholson and the Sergeant at Arms, William Christie, for trespass for having him removed when there had been no decision of the Electoral Court in accordance with the Electoral Act 1843. The Full Court of the Supreme Court held that under the Electoral Act 1843 it was only the Electoral Court that could determine there was a vacancy and not the Governor.

County of Cumberland
Two members to be elected

Cumberland Boroughs

County of Durham

On 26 July 1848, the day prescribed for nominations, Stuart Donaldson and Andrew Lang were nominated. A show of hands was in favour of Donaldson and Lang demanded a poll. The returning officer had neglected to make any preparations for a poll and so declared Donaldson elected. Donaldson attempted to resign on 16 August. The election was declared void by the court of disputed returns and a new writ issued.

Counties of Gloucester, Macquarie, and Stanley

The writ was not returned in time and the Governor issued a proclamation declaring the election was valid despite the delay.

Counties of Hunter, Brisbane and Bligh

City of Melbourne

Earl Grey, the Colonial Secretary in London, had never set foot in the colony and there was no suggestion he met the property requirement for election. He was nominated and elected as part of the campaign for independence, protesting against government by New South Wales.

Counties of Murray, King and Georgiana

County of Northumberland

Northumberland Boroughs

Town of Parramatta

Port Phillip
Five members to be elected

The original polling day was 27 July; however, no candidates were nominated for Port Phillip as a result of the campaign for independence from New South Wales. A further writ was issued on 25 August.

Counties of Roxburgh, Phillip and Wellington

Counties of St Vincent and Auckland

The writ was not returned in time and the Governor issued a proclamation declaring the election was valid despite the delay.

City of Sydney
Two members to be elected

See also
 Members of the New South Wales Legislative Council, 1843–1851

References

1848